Do-yeon is a Korean unisex given name. Its meaning differs based on the hanja used to write each syllable of the name. There are 44 hanja with the reading "do" and 39 hanja with the reading "yeon" on the South Korean government's list of hanja which may be registered for use in given names.

People with this name include:
Kim Do-yeon (politician) (1894–1967), Korean male independence activist, later a South Korean politician
Jeon Do-yeon (born 1973), South Korean actress
Jang Do-yeon (born 1985), South Korean comedienne
Kim Do-yeon (footballer) (born 1988), South Korean female footballer
Hwang Do-yeon (born 1991), South Korean male footballer
Kim Do-yeon (singer) (born 1999), South Korean female singer, member of Weki Meki

Fictional characters with this name include:
Seo Do-yeon, in 2013 South Korean television series I Can Hear Your Voice

See also
List of Korean given names

References

Korean unisex given names